Soviet naval reactors have been used to power both military and civilian vessels, including:

 Nuclear submarines:
 Attack submarines.
 Cruise missile submarines.
 Ballistic missile submarines.
 Nuclear icebreakers:
 
 s
 s
 Russian floating nuclear power stations:
 
 Nuclear cruisers:
 s
 Merchant ship:
 
 Command ship:
SSV-33 Ural

They have included both pressurized water reactors and a relatively few liquid metal fast reactors.

OKBM Afrikantov has been the primary designer of naval reactors for the Soviet/Russian Navy for more than 60 years.

Reactor types

'**'KPM-6 is developed by OKBM Afrikantov.

See also 
 List of commercial nuclear reactors
 List of United States Naval reactors
 Nuclear marine propulsion
Rolls-Royce PWR – United Kingdom's naval reactors
 United States Naval reactors

References

 
Nuclear technology in the Soviet Union